Jodha Akbar is an Indian Historical drama television series that aired from 18 June 2013 to 7 August 2015 on Zee TV and is also digitally available on ZEE5. The show was produced by Ekta Kapoor under Balaji Telefilms. Starring Rajat Tokas and Paridhi Sharma, it was a successful show with praises for its cast performances.  It replaced  Rab Se Sohna Isshq.  It was replaced by Tashan-e-Ishq in its timeslot.

Plot
Jodha Akbar is an epic drama that focuses on how the marriage policy brings the love of Jodha Bai and Akbar in a measure that has changed the destiny of India. This drama period also describes the wars of this time and the relations between the Mughals and Rajputs and how Jodha and Akbar face trials and tribulations to be  together. The drama also focuses on the operating Queens, courts, courtesans, ministers and their influence on the love story of Akbar and Jodha Bai. Finally, the show also portrays how Mughal Emperor Jalaluddin Muhammad acquires the title 'Akbar' from the people of India.

Jalaluddin Mohammad, a fearless warrior, son of Emperor Humayun and Hameeda Bano Begum, became the Emperor of the Mughal dynasty at a very young age. He is under the influence of Bairam Khan, his reagent, and Maham Anga, his foster mother. Bairam Khan has taught Jalal to be a ruthless and cruel ruler, and spread his rule by fear, conquer people by the sword. Jalal, following Bairam Khan's ideals becomes a heartless and fearsome ruler, whom the people dislike. He wants to conquer the entire Hindustaan, and presently, he is eyeing the golden Rajputana.

Jodha Bai, princess of Amer, daughter of Raja Bharmal and Rani Mainavati, is a kind and intelligent young girl, who believes in ruling people's hearts and that rule is spread by love and togetherness, not by force.

She decides to go to a far away temple to offer prayers on her birthday, along with Moti Bai, her friend and aide. While offering prayers there, a band of mughal soldiers come and start looting the jewellery of the Goddess. When Moti Bai tries to stop them, they try to molest her. Angered at this, Jodha asks who could be so cruel as to rob people of their religions, to which a temple person replied Jalaluddin Mohammad. Jodha pledges to destroy Jalal and present his head in front of the Goddess. 
Meanwhile, Moti Bai, embarrassed by the turn of events, decides to commit suicide, but Jodha prevents her. This makes Jodha even more vengeful.

Jalal punishes a man for stealing his shoes by cutting off his legs. He decides to meet Sharifuddin, a subedar of, close to Amer, so that he can wait for the right moment to attack the unaware Rajputs.

Cast

Main
 Rajat Tokas as Akbar, 3rd Mughal Emperor
 Paridhi Sharma as Jodha Bai/Laboni (while possessing Jodha), Akbar's favourite wife
 Smiley Suri /Lavina Tandon as Ruqaiya Sultan Begum, Akbar's first and chief wife
 Ashwini Kalsekar as Maham Anga (foster mother of Akbar, Adham's khan biological mother)
 Manisha Yadav as Salima Sultan Begum, Akbar's senior consort
 Ravi Bhatia as Salim (Akbar's son)
 Heena Parmar as Anarkali ( Salim's love interest)

Recurring
 Ankita Dubey as Moti Bai (maid of Jodha bai)
 Chhaya / Ishita as Hamida Banu Begum (Mariam Makani) Humayun's wife, Akbar's mother
 Lokendra Rajawat as Shamsuddin Ataga Khan
 Amarpreet Rait as Jiji Anga
 Chetan Hansraj as Adham Khan 
 Munendra Singh Kushwah as Raja Khambar Singh
 Prianca Sharma as Javeda Begum , wife of Adham khan, mother of Haider Khan.
 Ankit Raizada as Man Singh I
Jyotsna Chandola as Man bai
 Rajeev Saxena as Raja Bharmal
 Natasha Sinha as Rani Mainawati
 Kunal Bhatia as Rajkumar Bhagwant Das
 Nupur Saxena as Sa Bhagawati Ji Sahiba
 Bhakti Narula as Rani Lilavati
 Shweta Kanoje as Naazima Begam 
  Shaurya Singh as Raja Todarmal
 Kaif Ali Khan as Abdul Rahim Khan-i-Khanan
 Gopal K Singh as Birbal
 Vijay Badlani as Tansen
 Kunal Khosla as Qutubuddin Koka
 Sheezan K Mohd as Sultan Murad Mirza and young Akbar
 Gaurav Sharma as Sultan Daniyal Mirza
 Rohit Joshi as Farhan (Saleem's friend)
 Anurag Sharma as Maharana Pratap
  Ashok Devaliya as Hoshiyar Khan
 Vicky Batra as Kunwar Sujamal
 Pranav Misshra as Mirza Muhammad Hakim
 Parag Tyagi as Sharifuddin Hussain
 Sonakshi More as Bakshi Banu Begum a mughal princess 
 Mita Vashisht as Mah Chuchak Begum 
 Naved Aslam as Bairam Khan
 Gandharva Pardeshi as Rajkumar Jagannath
 Dev Bishit as Rajkumar Khangar
 Akhil Vaid as Rajkumar Raj Singh
 Abhilash Chaudhary as Raja Drumak
 Ajay Paul Singh Andotra as Mantri Lakshman Das
 Prince Singh as Suryabhan Singh
 Kalyani Trivedi as Shagunibai
 Meghna Naidu as Benazir
 Ketan Karande as Khyber Zaara
 Manoj Patel as Resham Khan
 Shilpa Raizada as Nigar/Shehnaz
 Ranveer Chahal as Rashid Khan
 Dharti Bhatt as Sukanya
 Sumbul Touqeer Khan as Mehtab
 Saniya Touqeer as young Anarkali
 Ayaan Zubair Rahmani as young Salim
 Javed Pathan as Sheikh Gadai
 Melanie Pais as Laboni
 Kamalika Guha Thakurta as Laboni's Mother
 Zeba Hussain as Chanda

Historical accuracy
Certain Rajput groups claimed Jodhaa was married to Akbar's son, Jahangir, not Akbar, whereas certain reports state that Jodha and Akbar were not married although the primary history proves that Akbar and the princess of Amber were married on which the show is made as a complete show can't be false. They also protested against the show along with Bharat Ka Veer Putra – Maharana Pratap, another historical series that aired on Sony TV. 

The title of the series was criticised by members of the Kshatriya community as misleading, politically motivated historical revisionism that minimised Rajput history. The community protested against the series in Rajasthan, and alleged that if the name was not changed they would not let any Balaji Telefilms films to be released in the state. Ekta Kapoor stated, "I always believe it's 80% history and 20% folklore. There are enough proofs that say it's true, but then there are some people who say it's not. Akbar had a certain graph and we know that. We cannot negate that there was a change of heart in him from a power-hungry ruler to a non-biased one because of his Rajput queen." The story is loosely true but has a wholesome addition of drama.

Production

The producer of the show, Ekta Kapoor was influenced by the 2009 big screen movie, Jodhaa Akbar, directed by Bollywood's Ashutosh Gowariker.

Rajat Tokas who had earlier worked with Ekta Kapoor in the soap opera, Tere Liye was selected to play the role of the protagonist Akbar.

Ekta Kapoor stated she conducted 7000 auditions for the female protagonist Jodha across the nation before selecting Paridhi Sharma.

Ashwini Kalsekar was selected to play the role of Maham Anga, Akbar's primary caretaker and protector.

Adaptations
This series is dubbed in Tamil as same name on Zee Tamil, in Telugu language as same name on Zee Telugu, in Bengali Language as same name on Zee Bangla, in Malayalam language as same name on Zee Keralam, and in English language as same name on Zee World Africa

Awards

References

External links

 Jodha Akbar at ZEE5

Indian period television series
Indian historical television series
Balaji Telefilms television series
Zee TV original programming
2013 Indian television series debuts
2015 Indian television series endings
Mughal Empire in fiction
Cultural depictions of Akbar
Cultural depictions of Tansen
Television series set in the 16th century
Cultural depictions of Jahangir
Television series about Islam